Kettering University is a private university in Flint, Michigan. It offers bachelor of science and master’s degrees in STEM (science, technology, engineering, and mathematics) and business fields. Kettering University undergraduate students are required to complete at least five co-op terms to graduate. Students gain paid work experience in a variety of industries with Kettering's more than 550 corporate partners, and graduate with professional experiences accompanying their degree.

Kettering University is named after inventor and former head of research for General Motors, Charles F. Kettering. He was a distinguished inventor, researcher, and proponent of cooperative education.

History

Founded as The School of Automotive Trades by Albert Sobey under the direction of the Industrial Fellowship of Flint on October 20, 1919, Kettering University has a long legacy with the automotive industry. The university became known as the Flint Institute of Technology in 1923 before being acquired by General Motors in 1926. It was renamed as the General Motors Institute of Technology and eventually the General Motors Institute in 1932.

Once referred to as the "West Point of the Automobile industry," GMI focused on creating business and industry leaders through the unique co-op model (following the development of this program at the University of Cincinnati in 1907). GMI also pioneered freshman-level manufacturing courses (Production Processes I & II), and automotive degree specialties. A fifth-year thesis requirement was added in 1945, and the Institute was granted the ability to award degrees. The first bachelor's degree was awarded on August 23, 1946.

During the 1950s, the co-op program required applicants to find a GM division to be their sponsor. School and work were mixed in four- or eight-week rotations, dividing the student body into four sections, two (A and B) for the four-week rotations, and two (C and D) for the eight-week rotations. At any given time, when section A was in school, section B was at work, and vice versa. Every four weeks, this situation would be reversed. Sections C and D were scheduled similarly, on an eight-week basis.  This resulted in students moving twelve or six times per year during a 48-week school/work year.  Because General Motors used the school to train its engineers, tuition was partially subsidized. In June 1979 (the Class of 1984) co-op rotations were expanded to twelve weeks.

Split from GM
After GM reduced operations in Flint, the company and the university separated on July 1, 1982. The name of the institution became "GMI Engineering & Management Institute" and the letters "GMI" were retained to allow easy identification with the old General Motors Institute. The university began charging full tuition as an independent private university. The university kept the cooperative education model, expanding the number of co-op employers for students. The university also began offering graduate programs for both on- and off-campus students.

Name change and expansion of programs
The university's name was formally changed to Kettering University on January 1, 1998, in honor of Charles Kettering. The name change allowed the university to create a separate identity from General Motors as well as publicize the fact that academic programs were expanding beyond just automotive-related offerings.

The university launched a physics program in 1995, and had the first ABET-accredited applied physics program in the world in 2013. A chemical engineering program as well as a pre-med course of study were launched in 2008. The chemical engineering program received ABET accreditation in 2013. The computer science program received ABET accreditation in 2007. The university added an applied biology program in 2013.

Academics
Kettering University offers Bachelor of Science degrees and offers master's degrees. Some masters programs are offered online, as the school launched distance education programs in 2015. Most undergraduate programs require completion of 160 credit hours for graduation. Kettering also offers students more than 40 minors, concentrations, specialties, and courses of study. Its most popular undergraduate majors, by 2021 graduates, were:
Mechanical Engineering (233)
Electrical and Electronics Engineering (44)
Computer Science (42)
Computer Engineering (26)
Industrial Engineering (24)
Chemical Engineering (23)

Accreditation 
As an institution, Kettering University programs are regionally accredited by the Higher Learning Commission.  A number of academic programs at the University have specific accreditation as well:

Rankings

Kettering University ranked 13th nationally among non-Ph.D.-granting engineering universities and seventh nationally among mechanical engineering programs in the 2017 U.S. News & World Report "Best Colleges" edition. The university also received a 'Best in the Midwest' designation from the Princeton Review.

Kettering ranked 12th nationally and first in the Midwest and Michigan in Return on Investment in PayScale.com's 2015 Return on Investment Rankings. PayScale.com also ranked Kettering 15th nationally and first in Michigan in its 2014 Salary Potential rankings. A 2015 CNNMoney.com article examining the top private colleges in the country in return on investment ranked Kettering 10th, noting that Kettering is sending graduates "out into the world with the skills employers are looking for."

An article in the 2014 issue of Automobile magazine listed Kettering University among five universities nationwide that students looking to break into the auto industry should attend. The article noted that Kettering University offers "a unique program that doesn't merely prepare students to work but puts them to work—three months in school, followed by three months on the job, repeat until graduation."

Kettering University was ranked 137th on Business Insiders 2014 list of "The 600 Smartest Colleges in America."

Research
Kettering University faculty have received ten Major Research Instrumentation (MRI) grants from the National Science Foundation since 2013, the most MRI grants in Michigan over that period of time. The grants have allowed Kettering to add equipment that includes an X-Ray Diffractometer, an X-Ray Photoelectron Spectroscopy (XPS) instrument, a motion capture system, a High-Throughput and High-Resolution Three-Dimensional Tissue Scanner with Internet-Connected 3D Virtual Microscope for Large-Scale Automated Histology, and the only 4G LTE Wireless system on a college campus in the country.

Kettering University is a partner with the federal government's U.S. Ignite program, which brings super high speed internet capabilities to Flint, Michigan. The technology will bring new healthcare, crime prevention, and educational opportunities to Flint. Kettering University also received a $1 million neighborhood stabilization grant from the United States Department of Justice in 2014 and is also participating as a research agent on the grant along with the University of Michigan and Michigan State University.

Research in Kettering University's Crash Safety Center has directly impacted national standards for child safety seats. The Crash Safety Center was featured on a Canadian Broadcasting Corporation segment in 2014 examining the effectiveness of pet harnesses for vehicles.

FIRST Robotics
Kettering University opened the FIRST Robotics Competition Community Center, the first facility of its kind on any college campus in the country, in 2014. Michigan Governor Rick Snyder attended the grand opening.

The facility provides work areas for eight FIRST teams with room to expand and allow space for as many as 16 teams. There is also a regulation size practice field as well as a machining lab. High school students on teams housed in the facility have access to Kettering University's faculty, staff, and students as mentors and the campus facilities. Approximately 25 percent of Kettering University's student body participated in FIRST Robotics in high school.

The intent of the facility is to create more opportunities for pre-college students, particularly students from underserved or financially disadvantaged populations, to gain exposure to science and engineering education and career possibilities. Kettering University also received a National Science Foundation grant in 2014 to provide scholarship to academically talented financially disadvantaged students who participated in high school robotics programs.

FIRST Robotics founder and famous inventor Dean Kamen, who has an honorary degree from Kettering University, toured the FIRST Robotics Community Center and spoke during a 2015 FIRST competition on Kettering's campus.

In his 2015 State of the State address, Michigan Governor Rick Snyder praised Kettering University's efforts in FIRST Robotics, calling the university a "true leader."

Academic departments
 Applied Biology: Launched in 2013, Kettering University's lab-oriented Applied Biology program has a strong focus on the molecular and cellular levels. The program includes significant hands-on opportunities in labs, courses, and undergraduate research, including the Bell-Kagle Research Internship, a paid, full-time research co-op position available to freshmen. Research being done by Kettering's Applied Biology faculty includes determining medicinal and antioxidant value of discarded fruit parts and finding more durable joint replacement materials. 
  Business: The Kettering University Department of Business prepares students to be fluent in the languages of innovation, markets, and global competition at home and abroad. Recent research by faculty in the department includes examining ways to improve delivery processes in supply chains, the factors that influence users to adopt mobile banking, and the financial benefits for companies that embrace environmentally friendly practices.
  Chemical Engineering: Kettering University's chemical engineering program is one of only six accredited programs in the state of Michigan. Students in the program work on synthesizing new materials, transform combinations of elements of matter, and develop processes to do it all safely. Students work on ways to better use limited petroleum resources, or design new processes to produce life-saving antibiotics and vaccines. The department received a Major Research Instrumentation grant from the National Science Foundation in 2014 to acquire an X-Ray Photoelectron Spectroscopy (XPS) instrument to support research on atmospheric pressure plasma on different surfaces.
  Chemistry and Biochemistry: Chemistry majors choose concentrations in marketing, management, electrical engineering, industrial engineering, mechanical engineering, bioengineering, or fuel cells—a track to prepare for careers in alternative energy. Biochemistry majors take additional classes in biology and learn life sciences at the molecular and cellular levels to prepare for careers in the chemical, pharmaceutical, or biotechnology fields.
  Computer Science: Computer Science majors take core courses in the art, science, and theory of computing, including operating systems, software construction, modern programming language concepts, and computing professionalism. Concentrations are available in Computer Gaming and Systems and Data Security. Bioinformatics students take a broad range of courses before undertaking work in genetic coding and learning how to algorithmically analyze and exploit the information contained in a strand of DNA. The department features one of the world's top experts on opportunistic mobile social networks.
  Electrical and Computer Engineering: Kettering University electrical engineering students take six core courses then design their curriculum to fit their professional goals. Computer engineering students focus on embedded computers built into many modern products, learning skills including writing real-time operating systems. ECE faculty Kevin Bai and Xuan Zhou were featured in a 2014 Fortune (magazine) article discussing the future of battery technology.

  Industrial and Manufacturing Engineering: Industrial Engineering students learn about process engineering with graduates impacting a variety of fields including healthcare, manufacturing, retail, and more. The Industrial Engineering program was ranked first in the country among non-Ph.D.-granting programs in the country in the 2014 U.S. News & World Report 'Best Colleges' edition. Industrial Engineering faculty member Justin Young was featured in a 2015 Fast Company article examining the future of ergonomics.
  Liberal Studies: Kettering University's liberal studies department supplements the university's science, engineering, math, and business programs with courses that help students understand cultural heritages and societies, develop communication and critical thinking skills, and understand ethics and the global economy.
  Mathematics: Kettering University's mathematics program teaches students the fundamentals of both modern and classical math, including calculus and complex variables to matrix and control theory. The Kettering Department of Mathematics hosted an international statistics conference focusing on urban communities and crime data in 2014.
  Mechanical Engineering: Kettering's Mechanical Engineering program was ranked seventh in the country in the 2017 U.S. News & World Report 'Best Colleges' edition. Students in the program customize their degree by earning a specialty concentration or by earning a minor in areas that include Automotive Engineering Design, Bioengineering Applications, Machine Design & Advanced Materials, and Alternative Energy. 

  Physics: Kettering University has the only ABET-accredited applied physics program in the world and also offers a degree in engineering physics. Both the applied physics and engineering physics programs focus on materials science, applied optics and acoustics, and nanotechnology. Physics faculty are doing research that includes developing alternative ocular cancer treatments and developing improved technology for non-electric warming blankets for infants in areas of the world with limited access to electricity.

Cooperative and experiential learning
All Kettering University undergraduate students are required to complete some form of experiential learning for every degree program. Cooperative education begins as early as a student's freshman year. Student schedules typically alternate between academic terms that include classes and labs and full-time employment with one of Kettering's more than 550 partner organizations. Typically, a student maintains employment with the same organization throughout the program.

Cooperative experience is paid, with freshman students earning an average of $14.20 per hour on their co-op terms and upperclassmen earning an average of $18.44 per hour. 98 percent of Kettering University graduates are employed or accepted into graduate school within six months of graduation.

Culminating Undergraduate Experience (thesis)
Kettering University undergraduates are required to complete a Culminating Undergraduate Experience to represent the combination of class and lab work with hands-on work experience on a focused study topic. Students can complete a thesis with their co-op sponsor or with research faculty, nonprofit community organizations, entrepreneurs, or other business ventures. Topics include new product development, process improvement, community enrichment, and new business planning.

Pre-med course of study
Kettering University launched a pre-med course of study in 2008. Kettering's pre-med program also has early assurance agreements with both Michigan State University College of Human Medicine and Lake Erie College of Osteopathic Medicine (LECOM), ensuring Kettering pre-med students admittance to the schools upon graduation. In 2013 Kettering and Hurley Medical Center announced the launch of a physician scribe program, providing co-op jobs for Kettering students at Hurley. An endowed scholarship was created in 2014 to support Flint-area students interested in pursuing a pre-med course of study to attend Kettering.

Innovation to Entrepreneurship course of study
Kettering's Innovation to Entrepreneurship course of study encourages students to focus on utilizing their technical skills to improve the lives of others for the greater good and achieve fulfillment in the process. Topics covered in the program include innovation, entrepreneurship, business model development, prototyping, and commercialization. In 2014, Kettering University dedicated an opportunity lab called the T-Space that provides students with access to 3D printing, laser cutting, soldering, and other tools aimed at supporting entrepreneurial thinking.

Kettering University also houses the Kettering Entrepreneur Society, an organization that meets regularly and provides seed funding for viable student business startup ideas.

Kettering University received a "Best in Class" award from the Kern Engineering Entrepreneurial Network (KEEN) for infusing entrepreneurship across the university in 2010.

Harvard Business School feeder
Kettering University is one of the feeder universities to Harvard Business School. In a 2013 interview with Fortune (magazine), Harvard Business dean of admissions Dee Leopold said, "We love Kettering in Flint." In 2015, Kelly Quinn, assistant director of admissions for Harvard Business, called Kettering students a "good fit" for Harvard Business School.

Study abroad
Kettering offers a variety of study abroad opportunities to students. Kettering students study at universities in Germany, China, Australia, and England. To promote study abroad, Kettering provides a $1,500 travel stipend to offset travel and living expenses. The Oswald Student Fellows program and the Ronald G. Greenwood Memorial Scholarship grant funds each term to qualified students.

Campus

Kettering University's campus is situated on approximately 90 acres of land along the Flint River on the west side of Flint. In 2012, as part of the university's mission to be an active leader in the revitalization of the city of Flint, Kettering began purchasing distressed properties from the Genesee County Land Bank, razing blighted structures, and taking over maintenance, mowing, and upkeep of the properties.

Kettering has successfully received neighborhood stabilization grants from the Department of Justice and Centers for Disease Control and Prevention to support revitalization of neighborhoods near campus and form a walkable connector from Kettering's campus to ongoing developments downtown Flint and on the campus of the University of Michigan–Flint.

Campus Master Plan
In 2014, Kettering University unveiled a new Campus Master Plan.

The plan's first phase was the construction of a new mixed-use Learning Commons building that was intended to house some academic department functions, a modern library, new food service venues and options, and other resources, including increased access to flexible, technology-enabled, collaborative spaces. It will also have spaces to accommodate alumni and other campus guests, integrating them into the campus community for the entirety of their visit.  The Learning Commons building was opened for use in 2022.

Future phases will include the construction of a new residence hall, new research facilities, and a raised connector across Chevrolet Avenue that pays homage to a bridge that existed when the property was home to the General Motors Chevrolet Division. The current Academic Building will include increased lab and community space, accommodating pre-collegiate programming.

Kettering University General Motors Mobility Research Center
In April 2015, Kettering University announced a $2 million naming donation from the General Motors Foundation to construct the Kettering University General Motors Foundation Automotive Research Area. The facility was conceived to be an automotive proving ground on a piece of campus that is the former site of the Chevrolet Division, or Chevy in the Hole. The proving ground will be built on a 19-acre parcel of land at the corner of Chevrolet Avenue and Bluff Street.

Eventually donning the name GM Mobility Research Center, the proving ground is an outdoor lab facility that includes various test areas as well as a dense research 4G LTE Advanced wireless infrastructure. It will enable new opportunities to enhance classroom and lab experiences for students and expand research opportunities for faculty and industry partners. At the time of its completion, it is the only facility of its kind on a college campus in the United States.

The project complements a major city of Flint project on the opposite side of the Flint River called Chevy Commons. The project converted a Flint-owned portion of Chevy in the Hole into an urban park that includes wetlands, woodlands, grasslands, green spaces, and paved recreation trails.

Academic Building
Kettering University's Academic Building was the first building constructed on campus and features a prominent arched architectural entrance at the corner of N. Chevrolet Avenue and University Avenue. This originally designed front entrance is constructed with impressive stonework and bears the insignia "General Motors Institute of Technology" in stone at the top of the archway. This entrance is featured in Kettering University's seal.

The building currently includes several labs, including a Polymer Processing Lab, Ergonomics Lab, a Work Design Lab, Applied Biology labs, Chemical Engineering labs, an Advanced Power Electronics Lab, Haptics Lab, Acoustics Lab, and many other lab spaces. The building also houses McKinnon Theater, the Humanities Art Center, a library, and departmental offices for Computer Science, Industrial and Manufacturing Engineering, Business, Liberal Studies, Applied Biology, Electrical and Computer Engineering, Physics, and Chemical Engineering.

Campus Center

The Campus Center is Kettering University's main administration building and includes the Office of the President, Student Life, Admissions and Financial Aid, University Advancement and External Relations, Alumni Engagement, Multicultural Student Initiatives, and Sponsored Research.

The Campus Center also houses three food service areas, including B.J.'s Lounge, a student center that was renovated with new, technology-enabled, flexible space in 2013. Kettering's Campus Safety headquarters are also in the Campus Center. In 2012, the university unveiled a state-of-the-art campus safety system with the support of the Lear Corporation, making the university's campus one of the safest in the country.

The Campus Center also provides community space, including classroom space for Oxford Virtual Academy and a regional office of the Michigan Small Business Development Center.

C.S. Mott Science and Engineering Building

The C.S. Mott Science and Engineering Building opened in 2003 and houses departmental offices as well as classroom space for Mechanical Engineering, Chemistry, and Biochemistry. The building includes several labs, including a powertrain lab, Kettering University's Crash Safety Center, a fuel cell lab, bioengineering labs, and other core science and engineering labs for students. The building also houses the T-Space, a student-driven opportunity lab with access to 3D printing, laser cutting, soldering, and other tools aimed at supporting entrepreneurial thinking.

Frances Willson Thompson Hall

Kettering University's residence hall is the sole on-campus student housing facility. All students are required to live in the residence hall during their freshman year.

All rooms in the building are single, air-conditioned rooms. Residents share community bathrooms located at the intersections of each hallway. The building also includes lounge areas, a community kitchen, laundry machines, a game room, and computer labs. Gaming consoles and other materials are available to check out in the facility, and the residence life staff creates several programs throughout the year for students living in the dorms.

Many students have created murals in the hallways of Thompson Hall, creating a living history of the many tenants in the buildings since it opened.

Connie and Jim John Recreation Center

Kettering's recreation center opened in 1995 and includes a 25-yard pool, indoor track, tennis, basketball, and racquetball courts, free weights, exercise equipment, an aerobics room, and meeting rooms.

Kettering University's commencement ceremonies are typically hosted in the recreation center. The facility has also hosted President Barack Obama during a 2008 campaign stop and Mitt Romney during the 2012 presidential campaign. King Carl XVI Gustaf of Sweden visited campus and spoke in the recreation center in 2008 Former Michigan State basketball star Mateen Cleaves hosted a basketball camp at the facility in 2014.

Learning Commons

Completed in 2022 and featuring an open-air atrium at its center, the Learning Commons building is home to a new cafeteria, coffee shop, auditorium, IT service desks, outdoor terraces, rooftop gardens, and over a dozen multi-use spaces for students to use to study and collaborate. The building is linked to the older Campus Center by a climate-controlled traverse, in which an art gallery resides that can be fitted with exhibits and displays.

Innovation Center

The Innovation Center at Kettering University, a 9,000-square-foot incubator for entrepreneurs, opened in 2010. The Innovation Center was the first Leadership in Energy and Environmental Design (LEED) certified building in Genesee County.

The center provides space for companies looking to grow their business, perfect their underlying technologies, and explore potential collaborations with Kettering University faculty, students, and corporate partners. The building includes technology-enabled collaborative space as well as laboratory and office spaces. Lab spaces feature wet and dry research capabilities and have designs that are easily reconfigurable to meet the needs of tenants. Customizable office spaces are also available. An art exhibit from the Mott-Warsh Collection is on a long-term rotational loan.

Atwood Stadium

Kettering University acquired Atwood Stadium, an 11,000-seat stadium that was previously designated a city park, from the city of Flint in 2013.

The stadium, which opened in 1929, has hosted many sporting events, concerts, political rallies, and other community events. President John F. Kennedy appeared there, and many successful athletes from Flint began their careers there, such as All American Lynn Chandnois of Michigan State,  Leroy Bolden, Tony Branoff, Heisman Trophy winner Mark Ingram II, and Olympic Gold Medalist Claressa Shields.

Kettering has made major repairs to the stadium, including fixing masonry work, restrooms, concessions areas, locker rooms, and lighting. in 2015, Kettering University replaced the turf in the stadium with a state-of-the-art field turf, making Atwood one of only three venues in the state of Michigan (the others are Ford Field and Michigan Stadium) with this field surface. With the replacement of the field surface, the field was expanded and lined to support NCAA/MLS soccer and men's and women's lacrosse play in addition to football.

Kettering University has constructed temporary ice rinks in the stadium and offered free open ice skating in the winters of 2014 and 2015.

Flint Children's Museum

The Flint Children's Museum, located on the campus of Kettering University, offers hands-on experiences for children ages two to ten. The museum features rotating exhibits that change every three months. Exhibit themes include How Things Work, Performing Arts, Health and Fitness, Our Town, and Discovery Zone.

The museum also features an outdoor educational area called Sproutside. The learning area was constructed in 2007 with support from the Ruth Mott Foundation and the Community Foundation of Greater Flint.

Student life
Nearly half of Kettering University's student body lives in the university's residence hall or in the Campus Village Apartments complex adjacent to campus. Many others live near campus in fraternity and sorority housing or private rentals, making the university's campus community close-knit. A variety of activities and organizations give students plenty of social outlets on and near campus.

Clubs/organizations
Kettering Student Government sponsors dozens of clubs to promote an atmosphere conducive to social interaction as well as to supplement educational opportunities for students by providing more options to arts and entertainment on campus. Kettering University's student grilling club was featured in an article in USA Today in 2013.

Clubs include a scuba diving club, an anime club, a fencing club, several sports and athletic clubs, dance clubs, fine and performing arts clubs, car clubs, and academic clubs. Kettering University also has student chapters for many professional organizations and societies, including the Society of Women Engineers, the National Society of Black Engineers, and oSTEM.

Kettering LEADERS Fellowship
In 1999, 31 graduating seniors committed to donating $10,000 each over 10 years to build up an endowment dedicated to student leadership development at Kettering University. Since then, the endowment has grown to over $450,000. The selective program is now known as the Kettering LEADERS Fellowship.

Service Saturdays
Kettering University students participate in monthly Service Saturdays, completing a variety of service projects in partnership with community organizations in the city of Flint. In 2014, 392 students volunteered and served more than 1,200 combined hours.

SAE Competition Teams
Kettering University competes in the Society of Automotive Engineering’s Collegiate Design Series by building competition vehicles to compete in the Baja SAE, Formula SAE, SAE Aero Design, and SAE Clean Snowmobile Challenge competitions. In 2018, Kettering University began competing in the SAE AutoDrive Challenge, in which students convert a Chevrolet Bolt vehicle into a SAE level 4 autonomous vehicle by the 3rd year of competition.

Each year, students design and build vehicles for national and international competitions. In 2015, Kettering's Clean Snowmobile Challenge team finished in the top two at its international competition for the fourth straight year (including a first-place finish in 2014). The Formula SAE team finished fourth out of 100 schools in competition in Brooklyn, Michigan in 2022. Previously, the Formula SAE team finished tenth at its competition in Lincoln, Nebraska in 2014, following a seventh-place finish in 2013.

DECA
Kettering University has a collegiate DECA team. Collegiate DECA helps students develop as business leaders by participating in competitions that promote career awareness, civic consciousness, social intelligence, and leadership. Competitions include activities in business, design, entrepreneurship, finance, accounting, foodservice, hospitality, information technology, management, marketing, and sales, among other areas.

Kettering students won 13 awards at a state of Michigan competition in 2015 and three awards at the international conference in Washington D.C. in 2014.

Model United Nations
Kettering University has a student Model United Nations (MUN) team. MUN teams feature students that roleplay as United Nations delegates and simulate United Nations committees at conferences or competitions.

Kettering University's team, which was formed in 2010, won its first-ever prize at an international competition at Model United Nations in the United States in November 2014 and won prizes at Harvard University in 2015 as well.

Greek life
Greek Life on the Kettering/GMI campus began in 1921. The first officially recognized organization was not formed until 5 years later as the White Elephants. Several other local fraternities would appear on campus during the following years. However, because during this time GMI was not accredited, no national/international recognized fraternities appeared on campus. When GMI did receive accreditation in 1962, the university would require all local fraternities to join a national/international fraternity. Many of the current fraternities on campus came from that transition. Currently, Kettering University has an active Greek system, which is recognized as an excellent source of service opportunities and leadership training. More than 40 percent of the student body is currently involved in a fraternity or sorority.

Many North American Interfraternity Conference (IFC) fraternities have chapters at Kettering as do several National Panhellenic Conference (NPC) sororities. The National Pan-Hellenic Council (NPHC) has several local chapters that are also affiliated with Kettering. IFC, NPC, and NPHC each have a school-wide council with representatives from each member organization. These councils are designed to facilitate communication between the different groups, and to facilitate relations with the university on matters such as school-wide events and membership.

Intramural sports
Kettering University offers intramural sports opportunities to students year-round. Sports offered include basketball, flag football, softball, soccer, volleyball, innertube water polo, outdoor broomball, volleyball, racquetball, Wiffleball home run derby, and more. The campus includes indoor basketball, tennis, and racquetball courts, a swimming pool, an indoor track, an outdoor track, softball and soccer fields, a sand volleyball court, and Atwood Stadium.

Student media
The low-power radio station WKUF-LP (94.3 FM) is run by Kettering University students and staff. It was founded in November 2004 and features music from several genres and talk programs from a variety of hosts.

Kettering University also has a student-run newspaper called The Technician. A print edition is published three times per term and an online edition is also published.

Notable alumni

Kettering University has approximately 25,000 alumni. Kettering University graduates have the highest starting salary and salary potential of any university in Michigan, according to PayScale.com in 2017. In 2015, Kettering was listed 12th in the nation in return-on-investment by Payscale.com  and 10th in the nation of all private universities and colleges by CNNMoney.com.

Kettering University graduates have attained prominent positions in a wide range of industries.

Mary Barra, CEO of General Motors, is a 1985 Kettering University graduate. During her commencement speech at the university in 2013, Barra noted that her education at Kettering played a key role in her career. She stated, "the practical, real-world experience that a Kettering education provides is as practical today as it was 30 years ago." Barra and former General Motors President Edward Nicholas Cole, a 1933 Kettering University graduate, give Kettering two graduates who have appeared on the cover of Time.

Raj Nair, the Ex Group Vice President of Ford Motor Company Engineering, is a 1987 Kettering graduate. Nair received a reader's choice award for Fortune magazine's Businessperson of the Year in the autos category in 2014.

Bob Kagle, a 1978 graduate, is one of the most successful venture capitalists in Silicon Valley history and was an early investor in eBay and Instagram. Kagle has been a longtime supporter of Kettering University, including launching a mentoring program for youth in the Flint community and supporting an endowment for research co-op positions for students majoring in biology, chemistry and biochemistry, and chemical engineering.

Karenann Terrell, a 1986 graduate, is the Chief Information Officer for Walmart. Paul Bascobert, a 1987 graduate, is the president of Bloomberg Businessweek. Rhonda Winter, a 1983 graduate, is the Chief Information Officer for the Indianapolis Motor Speedway. David Kenny, a 1984 graduate, is the CEO of The Weather Channel. Matt Borland, a 1994 graduate, is the former crew chief for NASCAR driver Ryan Newman. Gene Stefanyshyn, a 1981 graduate, is Vice President of Innovation and Racing Development for NASCAR. Henry Juszkiewicz, a 1976 graduate, is the chairman and CEO of Gibson Guitar Corporation.

See also
 Association of Independent Technological Universities

Notes

References

External links
 
 

 
Engineering universities and colleges in Michigan
Education in Flint, Michigan
Private universities and colleges in Michigan
Educational institutions established in 1919
General Motors facilities
Universities and colleges in Genesee County, Michigan
1919 establishments in Michigan
University, Kettering
Technological universities in the United States
Universities and colleges accredited by the Higher Learning Commission